Scottojapyx is a genus of diplurans in the family Japygidae.

Species
 Scottojapyx simienensis Pagés, 1957

References

Diplura